CJRK-FM is a radio station which broadcasts a multilingual format on the frequency 102.7 MHz in Toronto, Ontario, Canada. The station is owned by East FM, through licensee 8041393 Canada Inc., which received approval to operate a new FM radio station serving the Scarborough district on November 5, 2014. The station launched on September 1, 2016.

The station's programming targets teenagers and young adults in south, east and west-Asian communities in Scarborough and the Durham Region communities of Ajax and Pickering, and serves approximately 18 ethnic groups in a minimum of nine different languages.

References

External links
East FM website
East FM Facebook
CJRK-FM History - Canadian Communications Foundation

Jrk-Fm
Scarborough, Toronto
Jrk-Fm
Radio stations established in 2016
2016 establishments in Ontario